Thomas Bourke, 4th Baron Bourke of Castleconnell, was an Irish noble who held his title for only a matter of hours on 28 February 1599.

Family
Bourke was the son of Theobald Bourke (died 19 August 1578), a principal commander against Lord Desmond, and his wife Mary, daughter of Donough O'Brien, Earl of Thomond, and grandson of Sir William Bourke (created Baron Bourke of Castleconnell by Elizabeth I by patent dated 16 May 1580).  Thomas had been preceded as Baron Bourke of Castleconnell by his two elder brothers, John (who sat in parliament in Dublin in 1585 and was slain in battle at Hounslow, Middlesex on 14 January 1592, leaving no issue) and Richard (slain in battle by Dermot O'Connor Sligo at Ballynecargy, County Limerick on 28 February 1599, also leaving no issue).

At his death, Thomas left a daughter, Christina (wife of Sir Dominick White, Mayor of Limerick in 1636, later created Count of Alby and Marquis of Albeville in the Holy Roman Empire), and an infant son, Edmund Bourke, 5th Lord Bourke of Castleconnell.  During his youth, Theobald, younger brother of Thomas, usurped the title of Baron Bourke of Castleconnell, claiming that Edmund was illegitimate.  Theobald was later created Baron of Brittas in 1618, and Edmund, having established his legitimacy, continued the line of the Barons of Castleconnell.

Sources
Burke, Sir Bernard (Ulster King of Arms), A Genealogical History of the Dormant, Abeyant, Forfeited and Extinct Peerages of the British Empire, Burke's Peerage, Ltd., 1883, pp. 67–68.

References

Arms

16th-century Irish people
House of Burgh
Barons in the Peerage of Ireland
1599 deaths